As of December 2022, Sunclass Airlines operates flights to the following destinations:

References

External links 
Thomas Cook Airlines Scandinavia

Lists of airline destinations

sr:Редовне линије изиЏета